The Donald Beckon Ranch, near Zeona in Perkins County, South Dakota, was built in 1910.  It was listed on the National Register of Historic Places in 1987.

Two modern, metal buildings were deemed non-contributing. Most notable is the sod house built by Donald Beckon in 1910.

References

National Register of Historic Places in South Dakota
Buildings and structures completed in 1910
Perkins County, South Dakota
Sod houses